Tenderness is an album by J. D. Souther, released in 2015 on Sony Masterworks. It is Souther's first album of new songs since 2008's If the World Was You.

Track listing 
All songs written by J. D. Souther, except where noted.
"Come What May" – 3:16
"Something in the Dark" (Souther, Larry Klein) – 4:20
"This House" – 4:03
"Let's Take a Walk" (Souther, Klein) – 3:37
"Dance Real Slow" – 4:47
"Show Me What You Mean" – 2:33
"Horses in Blue" – 4:28
"Need Somebody" – 3:01
"Downtown (Before the War)" – 5:19
"All Your Wishes" - 4:09 (bonus track for Japan)

Personnel
J. D. Souther – vocals, acoustic and electric guitar, background vocals
Dean Parks – electric guitar
David Piltch – bass
Jay Bellerose – drums, percussion
Patrick Warren – piano, electric piano, organ, keyboards
Till Brönner – trumpet
Mark Robertson – violin
Alyssa Park – violin
Luke Maurer – viola
Vanessa Freebairn-Smith – cello
Larry Klein – keyboards
Chris Walters – piano
Billy Childs – piano
Lizz Wright – vocals, background vocals
Jeff Coffin – soprano saxophone
Matt Nelson – cello
Sam Bacca – percussion

Production
Larry Klein – producer
Lynne Earls – engineer
Nicolas Essig, Pablo Hernandez, Noah Dresner – assistant engineer
Billy Childs – strings arrangements
Tim Palmer – mixing engineer
Bernie Grundman – mastering

References

2015 albums
J. D. Souther albums
Albums produced by Larry Klein